Mogren is a surname. Notable people with the surname include:

 Joakim Mogren, fictional character
 Mikael Mogren (born 1969), Swedish bishop, theologian, and author
 Stefan Mogren (born 1968), Swedish footballer
 Torgny Mogren (born 1963), Swedish cross-country skier

See also
 Moren